Dylan Taylor (born October 23, 1970) is an American executive, space tourist, and super angel investor in the NewSpace industry. He is the chairman and CEO of Voyager Space Holdings and former global president of Colliers International.

Early life and education 
Dylan E. Taylor was born on October 23, 1970, in Denver, Colorado. He grew up in Idaho where his father was a professor of metallurgical engineering at the University of Idaho.

Taylor attended the University of Arizona where he graduated with a bachelor's degree in engineering in 1993. He later earned an MBA from the University of Chicago.

Career 
Taylor began his career in Chicago working for the Swiss electronics company Saia-Burgess. At the time, he was only one of the few employees of the company working in North America. By around 2000, Taylor was a general manager at the company overseeing a few thousand U.S. employees. In the early 2000s, Taylor left Saia-Burgess to move back to Chicago where he joined LaSalle Partners, an investment banking and real estate services firm. He was promoted several times at LaSalle before he left in 2009 to join Colliers International, a real estate services firm based Toronto.

While Taylor was at Colliers, the company grew from an annual revenue of $400 million to about $3 billion. In 2011 and 2012, Taylor was CEO of Colliers International's operations in the US, and was based in Seattle, Washington. He later became CEO of the company's operations in the Americas.

By the time the company went public in 2015, Taylor owned a significant share of Collier. From June 2015 to June 2019, Taylor served as Global President of Colliers International, before he was initially fired for misconduct relating to improper trading. According to Ars Technica, a "subsequent investigation, however, found there had been no improper dealings", and "Taylor and Colliers issued a joint statement, amicably settling the matter."

Space investment and flight 
Taylor became interested in the space industry in 2007 when he met Eric Anderson, co-founder of Space Adventures and became an investor in Anderson's ventures. He was initially an angel investor and focused on the space industry. His investments included in World View Enterprises in Arizona which is developing high-altitude balloons and Golden Spike Company in Colorado which planned to offer private commercial space transportation to the Moon. Taylor, along with Mark Cuban, was an early investor in Relativity Space.

In 2017, Taylor founded Space For Humanity, a nonprofit that plans to purchase seats on commercial spaceflight for people who typically would not have access. In February 2017, Taylor became the first private citizen to manufacture an item in space when a gravity meter he commissioned and co-designed was printed on the International Space Station. The item was subsequently donated to the Museum of Science and Industry in Chicago.

In October 2019, Taylor founded Voyager Space Holdings, a holding company focused exclusively on the space industry. The firm has acquired several companies, including Altius Space Machines, X.O. Markets (parent company of Nanoracks), and The Launch Company. Taylor serves as the chairman and CEO of Voyager Space Holdings.

He was named by PitchBook as one of Top 10 VC investors in the space tech industry in 2019. In 2020, he received the Commercial Space Business & Finance Award from the Commercial Spaceflight Federation. He has been interviewed and quoted about the future of the Space-related economy and space investing. He has written articles for SpaceNews and other industry publications. Taylor is also co-founding patron of the Commercial Spaceflight Federation. In June 2020, Xplore announced that Taylor, on behalf of Space For Humanity, had reserved payload space on its first mission beyond Earth orbit.

Blue Origin space flight
Taylor was among the tourists that flew into space on December 11, 2021, with Michael Strahan on Blue Origin NS-19. Taylor was one of four paying passengers on the six-person crew that took a 10-minute flight.

Personal life 
Taylor is married to Gabrielle V. Taylor. They have two daughters and live in Colorado.

See also
 List of people who descended to Challenger Deep

References

External links 
 

Living people
1970 births
University of Chicago Booth School of Business alumni
American corporate directors
Place of birth missing (living people)
Private equity and venture capital investors
American venture capitalists
Angel investors
Henry Crown Fellows
Space tourists
New Shepard passengers
People who have flown in suborbital spaceflight